Oracle XML Publisher (XMLP) is Oracle Corporation's latest reporting technology.  It was originally developed to solve the reporting problems faced by Oracle Applications. Osama Elkady from the Applications Technology Group and Tim Dexter from the Financials Group were the main drivers for the product. It was first released with Oracle E-Business Suite 11.5.10 in 2003. Since then it has been integrated into most of Oracle Products including JD Edwards EnterpriseOne application 8.12 and PeopleSoft Enterprise 9, and as a standalone version, XML Publisher Enterprise with no dependency on Oracle Applications. When XML Publisher became part of the Oracle BI Enterprise Edition Suite it was re-branded as Oracle BI Publisher.

BI Publisher separates the creation of data from the process of formatting it for different uses. 
The engine can format any well-formed XML data, allowing integration with any system that can generate XML, including Web Services or any data source available through JDBC.  BI Publisher can merge multiple data sources into a single output document.

Template design
BI Publisher report templates can be designed using the Microsoft Word, Adobe Acrobat, Microsoft Excel (standalone only) and Adobe Flash (standalone only).  Templates created using these tools contain embedded fields with properties that determine how the XML data will be merged into the template, using Extensible Stylesheet Language syntax to precisely match the server's engine.

Template Builder for Word
Template Builder is an extension to Microsoft Word that simplifies the development of Rich Text Format templates.  Templates created using Template Builder are transformed into XSL Stylesheets that can be used to generate 
PDF, RTF, Microsoft Excel and HTML outputs.

Layout Editor
Starting with the 11g release, BI Publisher also offers a pure web based layout editor that allows users to create management
reports and simple production reports in a WYSIWYG layout editor. The layout editor is written in pure DHTML. 
As with  Rich Text Format templates Reports created in the web based layout editor are transformed into XSL stylesheets
and can be viewed in the same output formats. In addition, the layout editor templates (.xpt) can also be viewed in an interactive viewer which allows re-sorting and interactive filtering of existing reports.

Adobe Acrobat
XML Publisher templates can be designed in Adobe Acrobat 5.00 and above, using the native form field capabilities.

Adobe Flash
The 10.1.3.3 release of Oracle BI Publisher offers support for Adobe Corporation's new document format for building interactive forms and reports, called Flex. You can build Flex templates, test them on your desktop, and deploy them to the BI Publisher server to generate Flash output. Users are then able to run the reports from the BI Publisher user interface or schedule them for delivery to report consumers.

XSL Stylesheet
In addition to using the tools mentioned above, users can also upload existing XSL stylesheets to run with BI Publisher.

Data Template/Model design
BI Publisher supports the generation of XML data from SQL queries, web services, XML files and XML HTTP servers, 
LDAP queries, MDX queries (starting 10.1.3.4.1), Oracle ADF view objects (11g) and Microsoft EXCEL files (11g).
While previous version allowed the simple addition through a UI, linking of queries required the creation of an XML
configuration file. In 11g the data model can be created using a web based visual data model builder.

Server
The server is a Java EE application that can be deployed to any Java EE container.  The XML data is fed through the templates to produce XSL Formatting Objects, which can be transformed into most popular output formats:
 Portable Document Format
 Rich Text Format
 HTML
 PPT
 Flash
 Plain Text (e.g. EFT/EDI)

Delivery Manager
The Delivery Manager is responsible to deliver the output to different destinations, such as fax and email, with the flexibility of delivering the same output to different destinations; e.g. HTML format can be sent to email while a PDF format sent to the printer.

The following protocols are supported:
 SMTP
 Internet Printing Protocol (IPP)
 WebDAV
 FTP
 SFTP
 AS2

The Delivery Manager provides an open architecture that allows custom delivery channels to be implemented.

References

External links
 Official Oracle Page
 Official Blog
 Official Youtube Channel
 Official Facebook Page
 Official Twitter Account

Oracle software
Reporting software
XML software